List of winners of the Welsh Learner of the Year (Tlws Dysgwr y Flwyddyn), a competition held every year at the National Eisteddfod of Wales.

 1983 - Shirley Flower, Clwyd
 1986 - Alan Whittick, Powys
 1988 - Jenny Pye, Llanbedrgoch, Anglesey
 1989 - Stel Farrar, Mynydd Llandegai, Gwynedd
 1990 - Parchg John Gillibrand, Carmarthenshire
 1991 - Jo Knell, Cardiff
 1992 - Sandy Rolls, Penderyn, Rhondda Cynon Taf
 1993 - Janet Charton, Betws y Coed, Conwy
 1994 - Sarah Williams, Llandeilo, Carmarthenshire
 1995 - Paul Attridge, Wrexham
 1996 - Mark Aizelwood, Newport
 1997 - Paul Elliott, Newport
 1998 - Stephen Wilshaw, Cardiff
 1999 - Alison Layland, Oswestry
 2000 - Sandra de Pol, Argentina
 2001 - Spencer Harris, Wrexham
 2002 - Alice Traille James, Crymych, Pembrokeshire
 2003 - Mike Hughes, Carno, Powys
 2004 - Lois Arnold, Abergavenny, Monmouthshire
 2005 - Sue Massey, Penmaenmawr, Conwy
 2006 - Stuart Imm, Cwmbran, Torfaen
 2007 - Julie MacMillan, Rhondda
 2008 - Madison Tazu, Cardiff
 2009 - Meggan Lloyd Prys, Rhiwlas, Bangor, Gwynedd
 2010 - Julia Hawkins, Crickhowell
 2011 - Kay Holder, Vale of Glamorgan
 2012 - Isaias Grandis, Trevelin, Patagonia, Argentina
 2013 - Martyn Croydon, Llŷn, Gwynedd
 2014 - Joella Price, Cardiff
 2015 - Gari Bevan, Merthyr Tydfil
 2016 - Hannah Roberts, Brynmawr, Blaenau Gwent
 2017 - Emma Chappell, Deiniolen, Gwynedd
 2018 - Matt Spry, Cardiff
 2019 - Fiona Collins, Carrog, Denbighshire
 2020 - Jazz Langdon, Narberth, Pembrokeshire
 2021 - David Thomas, Carmarthen, Carmarthenshire
 2022 - Joe Healy, Cardiff

References 

Welsh language